openMSX is a free software emulator for the MSX architecture. It is available for multiple platforms, including Microsoft Windows and POSIX systems such as Linux

For copyright reasons, the emulator cannot be distributed with original MSX-BIOS ROM images. Instead, openMSX includes C-BIOS, a minimal implementation of the MSX BIOS, allowing some games to be played without the original ROM image. It is possible for the user to replace C-BIOS by native BIOS if they prefer.

OpenMSX emulates a large amount of MSX systems and MSX related hardware, including:

MSXturboR
Moonsound
IDE Controller by Sunrise
GFX9000
Pioneer Palcom LaserDisc

Also some computer systems similar to MSX are emulated, like the SpectraVideo SVI-318/328, ColecoVision and Sega SG-1000.

Notable features include:
Hard- and software Scalers
Debugging
Tcl Script Support
Cheat Finder (through Tcl)
Game Trainers (through Tcl)
Audio/Video recording
Reverse support (go back in emulated time to correct mistakes or debug what happened)

OpenMSX has an open communication protocol to communicate with the openMSX emulator. Utilizing this communication protocol enables to write versatile add-ons for openMSX. Projects making use of this protocol include the following applications:
openMSX Catapult (by the openMSX team)
openMSX Debugger (by the openMSX team)
openMSXControl plugin
NekoLauncher openMSX
openMSX Peashooter
openMSX Control Plugin for Gedit

Currently Catapult, a GUI developed for the emulator that is part of the project, is being redeveloped utilizing Python and the Qt toolkit.

The openMSX Debugger is also under development, written in C++, also utilizing the Qt Toolkit.

References

Sources

Project Homepage
Project Forum
C-BIOS Compatibility Page
openMSX 0.5.1 review (2005)
NekoLauncher openMSX
openMSX Peashooter 
openMSX Control Plugin for Gedit
openMSX development builds for Mac, Windows, Android & Dingux

Free emulation software
Free software programmed in Tcl
Free software projects
Linux emulation software
MSX emulators
Software that uses wxWidgets
Unix emulation software
macOS emulation software
Windows emulation software
Android emulation software
Free and open-source Android software